Marína Paulínyová (28 March 1897 – 5 October 1945) was a Slovak-American diplomat, journalist, humanitarian and translator. She served as a deputy director of the Czechoslovak Red Cross.

Early life 
Paulínyová was born in Slovenské Pravno in a Lutheran family. When she was eight years old, the family emigrated to the United States for economic reasons. The family settled in Stamford, Connecticut. Although the family originally planned to return to Slovakia, they eventually stayed mainly due to the sudden death of Paulínyová's father.

Already as a teenager, Paulínyová was active in helping Slovak immigrant workers find employment in America. After the independence of Czechoslovakia, she started working at the country's consulate in the US.

Interwar period 
On 30 May 1919 she boarded a Red Cross ship in San Francisco bound to relieve Czechoslovak legionaries stranded in Siberia. The ship crashed and nearly sunk but its passengers including Paulínyová , who was on board as a nurse, were rescued by Japanese sailors. Paulínyová spent next three years organizing medical help for the legionaries and joined the final transport with injured legionaries to Czechoslovakia.

In the interwar period Paulínyová divided her time between Czechoslovakia and the US. In Czechoslovakia she established a YWCA branch in Bratislava and headed the first travel agency in Slovakia Slovakotour. In the US, she operated the Czechoslovak Art Studio in Chicago and was active in the Anglo American Society of Czechoslovakia. She also assisted the nascent Czechoslovak diplomacy, chiefly as a translator.

World War II era 
The outbreak of World War II caught Paulínyová in Bratislava, where she was posted as a correspondent for the American press. Narrowly evading arrest by the fascist regime, she left for London, where the Czechoslovak government in exile was located. In Britain, she was active in the Czechoslovak Red Cross, chiefly in the area of organizing relief for Czechoslovak prisoners of war captured by Germans, who otherwise received minimal support due to not being internationally recognized as combatants. Paulínyová managed to smuggle the aid for the captives raised through private donors by bundling it with the aid for British captives, who enjoyed international recognition, organized by the British Red Cross. She also raised funds to support Czechoslovak students in the United Kingdom, who struggled to continue their studies without any support from home.

Death and legacy 
On 5 October 1945 a Consolidated B-24 Liberator plane, which took off from Blackbushe Airport with Paulínyová and other Czechoslovak passengers  on board flying to Prague, crashed near Elvetham  with no survivors. The victims of the crash are commemorated by a memorial at Brookwood Cemetery in Surrey, England maintained by the Czech and Slovak embassies. On 4 December 2019, the president of Slovakia

The contributions of Paulínyová, as well as her death remained largely unknown in Czechoslovakia, due to her allegiance with the democratic government in exile, which the Communist perceived as Western and thus the enemy in the Cold War logic. As a result, Paulínyová only started receiving recognition by the end of 2010s. On 4 December 2019, the president of Slovakia Zuzana Čaputová planted a Tree of Peace by the renovated memorial of the Elvetham air crash victims. In 2022, a street in the Dúbravka borough of Bratislava was named after Marína Paulínyová.

References 

1897 births
1945 deaths
People from Turčianske Teplice District
Victims of aviation accidents or incidents in 1945